Luke Keough (born August 10, 1991 in Sandwich, Massachusetts) is an American cyclist, who last rode for amateur team Texas Roadhouse. He also specializes in cyclo-cross. Keough currently resides in Colorado Springs.

In 2017, he married fellow professional cyclist Kaitlin Keough.

Major results

2010
1st Kelly Cup
2012
1st Tour of Somerville
3rd Overall, Harlem Skyscraper Classic
2013
1st Overall Tulsa Tough
1st Stages 1, 2 & 3
1st Old Pueblo Grand Prix
1st Wilmington Grand Prix
1st USA Crits Finals, Las Vegas
2nd Overall, Tour de Grove
2014
1st Stage 1 Tour de Taiwan
2015
2nd Sunny King Criterium
3rd United States National Criterium Championships
2017
 Tour du Maroc
1st Stages 2, 3 & 9

References

External links

1991 births
Living people
American male cyclists